Tupper Lake Central School District is a school district in Tupper Lake, New York, United States. The superintendent is Russell Bartlett. The district operates two schools: Tupper Lake Middle High School and L.P. Quinn Elementary School.

Administration 
As of 2010, the Superintendent is Seth McGown.

Selected Former Superintendents 
Previous assignment and reason for departure denoted in parentheses
Michael A. Hunsinger – 1994–2005 (Superintendent - Waterloo Central School District, retired)
Daniel Bower – 2005–2006

Tupper Lake Middle-High School 

Tupper Lake Middle-High School serves grades 7 through 12. The current principal is Ms. Seth McGowan.

History

Selected former principals 
Previous assignment and reason for departure denoted in parentheses
James Ellis 1977-1996
Paul J. Alioto 1996 - 2000
Michael Powers 2000 - 2001
Eugene "Gene" H. Johnson Jr. 2001 - 2004 
Pam Martin 2004  - 2011

L.P. Quinn Elementary School 

L.P. Elementary School serves grades K through 6. The current principal is Carolyn Merrihew.

References

External links
Official site

School districts in New York (state)
Education in Franklin County, New York